Lakewood Suburban Development Area (SDA) is an area in Saskatoon, Saskatchewan, Canada.  It is a part of the east side community of Saskatoon.  It lies (generally) north of the outskirts of the City and the Rural Municipality of Corman Park No. 344, west of outskirts of the City and the Rural Municipality of Corman Park No. 344, south of the  University Heights SDA, and east of the Nutana SDA.

Neighbourhoods 

Lakewood Suburban Centre and Rosewood (2006) Expansion are two neighbourhoods of growth in this SDA.

Recreation facilities
 City of Saskatoon Lakewood Civic Center
 Lakewood Park

Shopping
 The Centre At Circle & Eighth
 College Park Mall
 Market Mall

Education 
Lakewood SDA is home to the following schools:

Separate (Catholic) education

Secondary schools

Elementary schools
 Bishop Pocock School
 Cardinal Leger School
 St. Augustine School
 St. Bernard School
 St. Luke School

Public education

Secondary schools
 Evan Hardy High School

Secondary Schools of Saskatoon

Elementary schools
 College Park School
 Lakeview School
 Lakeridge School
 Roland Michener School
 Wildwood School

Library
 Saskatoon Public Library Cliff Wright Branch

Transportation

City transit
The following routes serve the area, all meeting at the bus terminal at The Centre Mall.
 Route 1 – Wildwood/Westview
 Route 2 – 8th Street/Meadowgreen
 Route 3 – College Park/Riversdale
 Route 5 – Briarwood/Fairhaven
 Route 50 – Lakeview/Pacific Heights (DART)
 Route 60 – Lakeridge/Confederation Park (DART)

References

External links 

Neighbourhoods in Saskatoon